Panitan, officially the Municipality of Panitan (Capiznon/Hiligaynon: Banwa sang Panitan), is a 3rd class municipality in the province of Capiz, Philippines. According to the 2020 census, it has a population of 42,565 people.

Geography

Barangays
Panitan is politically subdivided into 26 barangays.

Climate

Demographics

Economy

References

External links

 [ Philippine Standard Geographic Code]
Philippine Census Information

Municipalities of Capiz